Martinho Andrade de Oliveira was a Portuguese footballer who played as defender.

Football career
Oliveira gained 6 caps for Portugal. He made his debut 1 April 1928 in Lisbon in a 0-0 draw against Argentina.

External links

Portuguese footballers
Association football defenders
Sporting CP footballers
Portugal international footballers
Year of birth missing
Year of death missing